Young Hare is a 1502 watercolour and bodycolour painting by German artist Albrecht Dürer. Painted in 1502 in his workshop, it is acknowledged as a masterpiece of observational art alongside his Great Piece of Turf from the following year. The subject is rendered with almost photographic accuracy, and although the piece is normally given the title Young Hare, the portrait is sufficiently detailed for the hare to be identified as a mature specimen — the German title translates as "Field Hare" and the work is often referred to in English as the Hare or Wild Hare. 

The subject was particularly challenging: the hare's fur lay in different directions and the animal was mottled with lighter and darker patches all over, Dürer had to adapt the standard conventions of shading to indicate the outline of the subject by the fall of light across the figure. Despite the technical challenges presented in rendering the appearance of light with a multi-coloured, multi-textured subject, Dürer not only managed to 
create a detailed, almost scientific, study of the animal but also infuses the picture with a warm golden light that hits the hare from the left, highlighting the ears and the run of hair along the body, giving a spark of life to the eye, and casting a strange shadow to the right. 

Dürer lightly sketched the image and underpainted it with some washes of brown watercolour. Then he patiently built up the texture of the fur with a variety of dark and light brushstrokes in both watercolour and bodycolour. Gradually, the painting was brought to completion with the addition of a few refined details such as the whiskers and the meticulous reflection of a window in the creature's eye.

There is some debate over how Dürer accurately captured the image of the hare: he may have sketched a hare in the wild and filled in the individual details from a dead animal, or captured one and held it alive in his studio while he worked on the painting. A reflection of the window frame in the hare's eye is often cited as evidence for the theory that Dürer copied the hare from life in his workshop, but this cross-barred reflection is a technique that Dürer frequently used to add vitality to the eyes of his subjects.

Dürer used his watercolour and bodycolour studies as source material for his prints, but in The Holy Family with Three Hares the hares are modestly rendered, and in the only of his other prints to feature a hare, the 1504 copperplate engraving Adam and Eve, the hare is turning away, half-hidden behind the legs of Eve. The prominent date and Dürer monogram on the Young Hare indicate that Dürer considered it a work in its own right rather than merely a preparatory sketch. The painting engendered numerous copies: at least twelve from contemporaries are known.

References
 Elisabeth M. Trux: Überlegungen zum Feldhasen und anderen Tierstudien Dürers mit einer Datierungsdiskussion. In: K.A. Schröder, M.L. Sternath: Albrecht Dürer. Hatje Cantz, Ostfildern-Ruit 2003, S. 45–55. 
 Heinz Widauer: Feldhase. In: K. A. Schröder, M. L. Sternath: Albrecht Dürer.  Hatje Cantz Verlag, Ostfildern-Ruit 2003, S. 268.

External links
The painting's page at the Albertina.

Watercolours by Albrecht Dürer
1502 paintings
Rabbits and hares in art
Collections of the Albertina, Vienna